The Hungarian invasions of Europe took place in the 9th and 10th centuries,
the period of transition in the history of Europe in the Early Middle Ages, when the territory of the former Carolingian Empire was threatened by invasion from multiple hostile forces, the Magyars (Hungarians) from the east, the Viking expansion from the north and the Arabs from the south.

The Magyars successfully conquered the Carpathian Basin (corresponding to the later Kingdom of Hungary) by the end of the ninth century, and launched a number of plundering raids both westward into former Francia and southward into the Byzantine Empire. The westward raids were stopped only with the Magyar defeat of the Battle of Lechfeld of 955, which led to a new political order in Western Europe centered on the Holy Roman Empire. The raids into Byzantine territories continued throughout the 10th century, until the eventual Christianisation of the Magyars and the establishment of the Christian Kingdom of Hungary in 1000 or 1001.

History

Before the conquest of Hungary (9th century)

The first supposed reference to the Hungarians in war is in the 9th century: in 811, the Hungarians (Magyars) were in alliance with Krum of Bulgaria against Emperor Nikephoros I possibly at the Battle of Pliska in the Haemus Mountains (Balkan Mountains).<ref name='Király'>{{Cite book| last = Király | first = Péter | title = Gondolatok a kalandozásokról M. G. Kellner "Ungarneinfälle..." könyve kapcsán | url = http://www.c3.hu/~magyarnyelv/00-1/kiraly.htm}}</ref> Georgius Monachus' work mentions that around 837 the Bulgarian Empire sought an alliance with the Hungarians.
Constantine Porphyrogenitus wrote in his work On Administering the Empire that the Khagan and the Bek of the Khazars asked the Emperor Teophilos to have the fortress of Sarkel built for them. This record is thought to refer to the Hungarians on the basis that the new fortress must have become necessary because of the appearance of a new enemy of the Khazars, and no other people could have been the Khazars’ enemy at that time. In the 10th century, Ahmad ibn Rustah wrote that "earlier, the Khazars entrenched themselves against the attacks of the Magyars and other peoples".

In 860–861, Hungarian soldiers attacked Saint Cyril's convoy but the meeting is said to have ended peacefully. Saint Cyril was traveling to the Khagan at (or near) Chersonesos Taurica, which had been captured by the Khazars.
Muslim geographers recorded that the Magyars regularly attacked the neighboring East Slavic tribes, and took captives to sell to the Byzantine Empire at Kerch.
There is some information about Hungarian raids into the eastern Carolingian Empire in 862.

In 881, the Hungarians and the Kabars invaded East Francia and fought two battles, the former (Ungari) at Wenia (probably Vienna) and the latter (Cowari) at Culmite (possibly Kulmberg or Kollmitz in Austria). In 892, according to the Annales Fuldenses, King Arnulf of East Francia invaded Great Moravia and the Magyars joined his troops. After 893, Magyar troops were conveyed across the Danube by the Byzantine fleet and defeated the Bulgarians in three battles (at the Danube, Silistra and Preslav). In 894, the Magyars invaded Pannonia in alliance with King Svatopluk I of Moravia.

After the conquest of Hungary (10th century)

Around 896, probably under the leadership of Árpád, the Hungarians (Magyars) crossed the Carpathians and entered the Carpathian Basin (the plains of Hungary, approximately).

In 899, these Magyars defeated Berengar's army in the Battle of Brenta River and invaded the northern regions of Italy. They pillaged the countryside around Treviso, Vicenza, Verona, Brescia, Bergamo and Milan. They also defeated Braslav, Duke of Lower Pannonia. In 901, they attacked Italy again. In 902, they led a campaign against northern Moravia and defeated the Moravians whose country was annihilated. Almost every year after 900 they conducted raids against the Catholic west and Byzantine east. In 905, the Magyars and King Berengar formed an amicitia, and fifteen years passed without Hungarian troops entering Italy.

The Magyars defeated no fewer than three large Frankish imperial armies between 907 and 910, as follows. In 907 they defeated the invading Bavarians near Brezalauspurc, destroying their army, successfully defending Hungary and laying Great Moravia, Germany, France and Italy open to Magyar raids. On 3 August 908 the Hungarians won the Battle of Eisenach, Thuringia. Egino, Duke of Thuringia was killed, along with Burchard, Duke of Thuringia and Rudolf I, Bishop of Würzburg. The Magyars defeated Louis the Child's united Frankish Imperial Army at the first Battle of Lechfeld in 910.

Smaller units penetrated as far as Bremen in 915. In 919, after the death of Conrad I of Germany, the Magyars raided Saxony, Lotharingia and West Francia. In 921, they defeated King Berengar's enemies at Verona and reached Apulia in 922. Between 917 and 925, the Magyars raided through Basel, Alsace, Burgundy, Provence and the Pyrenees.

Around 925, according to the Chronicle of the Priest of Dioclea from the late 12th century, Tomislav of Croatia defeated the Magyars in battle, however others question the reliability of this account, because there is no proof for this interpretation in other records.

In 926, they ravaged Swabia and Alsace, campaigned through present-day Luxembourg and reached as far as the Atlantic Ocean. In 927, Peter, brother of Pope John X, called on the Magyars to rule Italy. They marched into Rome and imposed large tribute payments on Tuscany and Tarento. In 933, a substantial Magyar army appeared in Saxony (the pact with the Saxons having expired) but was defeated by Henry I at Merseburg. Magyar attacks continued against Upper Burgundy (in 935) and against Saxony (in 936). In 937, they raided France as far west as Reims, Lotharingia, Swabia, Franconia, the Duchy of Burgundy and Italy as far as Otranto in the south. They attacked Bulgaria and the Byzantine Empire, reaching the walls of Constantinople. The Byzantines paid them a “tax” for 15 years. In 938, the Magyars repeatedly attacked Saxony. In 940, they ravaged the region of Rome. In 942, Hungarian raids on Spain, particularly in Catalonia, took place, according to Ibn Hayyan's work. In 947, Bulcsú, a chieftain of Taksony, led a raid into Italy as far as Apulia, and King Berengar II of Italy had to buy peace by paying a large amount of money to him and his followers.

The Battle of Lechfeld in 955, in which the Magyars lost approximately 5,000 warriors, finally checked their expansion, although raids on the Byzantine Empire continued until 970.  Lechfeld is south of Augsburg in present-day southern Germany.

Between 899-970, according to the contemporary sources, the researchers count 45 (according to Nagy Kálmán) or 47 (according to Szabados György 38 to West and 9 to East) raids in different parts of Europe. From these campaigns only 8 (17,5 %) were unsuccessful (901, 913, 933, 943, 948, 951, 955, 970) and 37 ended with success (82,5 %).

Timeline of the Hungarian invasions
Before the Hungarian Conquest

 811 – The Hungarians were in alliance with Krum of Bulgaria against Emperor Nikephoros I at the Battle of Pliska in the Haemus Mountains (Balkan Mountains).

 839 – The Hungarians, who then lived East to the Carpathians, in Etelköz, fight at Lower Danube at the request of the First Bulgarian Empire against the Byzantine insurgents.
 861 – Saint Cyril is attacked in Crimea by Hungarians "screaming like wolves", but seeing him praying, they became peaceful.
 862 – First raid of the Hungarians in the Carpathian Basin at the request of Rastislav of Moravia against East Francia.
 c. 870 – al-Djayhani and Ahmad ibn Rustah writes that the Hungarian tribes attack the Slavs who live near their borders, defeat them continuously and drive many of them to Kerch in Crimea, selling them to the Byzantines as slaves.
 881 – The Hungarian troops, helping the Moravians, fight two battles against the Germans.
 882 – The Hungarian "king" meet with Saints Cyril and Methodius at the Lower Danube to discuss.
 892 – The Hungarian troops attack Great Moravia in alliance with the East Francian king Arnulf of Carinthia.

 894
 In alliance with Svatopluk I of Moravia, the Hungarians attack the East Francian province of Pannonia. Svatopluk dies during this war.
 The Bulgarians, led by Simeon I of Bulgaria, attack the Byzantines, who ask for Hungarian help. A Hungarian army, led by Liüntika, defeats the Bulgarian army in three battles (at the Danube, Silistra and Preslav), and force Simeon to retreat to Silistra.
 895 – Simeon allies with the Pechenegs, and attacks in alliance with them the Hungarians, forcing them to retreat towards West and enter in the Carpathian Basin. The Hungarians conquer the eastern parts of the Carpathian Basin (until the river Danube). Here the Hungarians defeat the Bulgarians in Southern Transylvania and Tiszántúl, and end their power in the Carpathian Basin, starting with this the Hungarian Conquest.

After the Hungarian Conquest
 899 – The Hungarian troops attack the Italian Kingdom, and defeat, at 24 September, in the Battle of Brenta the army of Berengar I of Italy, burning Modena, and attacking Venice. Berengar accepts to pay them tribute.

 900 – The Hungarian army units conquer Pannonia, after their alliance proposal to the East Francians was rejected. This was another step in the Hungarian Conquest.
 901
 Hungarian attack to Carinthia and Northern Italy.
 April 11 or 18 – The Magyar army from Carinthia is defeated by Margrave Ratold at Laibach.
 902 – The Hungarians conquer the eastern parts of Great Moravia, ending with this the Hungarian Conquest of the Carpathian Basin, while the Slavs from West and North to this region, start to pay tribute to them.
 903 – A Hungarian unit raiding in Bavaria, is defeated near the river Fischa.
 904
 The Hungarian political and military leader Kurszán (kende, gyula or horka) is invited to a feast and then assassinated by the Bavarians.
 early summer – Hungarian troops go to Lombardy.
 905
 King Berengar of Italy makes alliance with the Hungarians against his enemy, Louis of Provence, who declared himself emperor of Italy.
 early summer – The Magyars defeat Louis of Provence, who is then blinded by Berengar.

 906 – Two Hungarian armies devastate, one after the other, the Duchy of Saxony. The Magyars were asked to come by the Slavic tribe of Dalamancians, threatened by the Saxon attacks.
 907
 July 4–6 – An East Francian army led by Luitpold, Margrave of Bavaria, which entered the Hungarian territory in order to expel the Hungarians from the Carpathian Basin, is annihilated by the Hungarian army in the Battle of Pressburg. Luitpold, Dietmar I, Archbishop of Salzburg, Prince Sieghard, 19 counts, 2 bishops and 3 abbots are killed in the battle, together with the majority of the soldiers. This battle is considered the conclusion of the Hungarian Conquest.
 July–August – The Hungarians assault Bavaria, making great destructions, and occupying many towns, in their way home, defeating a Bavarian army at Lengenfeld. The Hungarian-Bavarian border is fixed on the Enns river.
 908 – Hungarians attack Thuringia and Saxony, and on 3 August defeat in the Battle of Eisenach the army of Burchard, Duke of Thuringia. Burchard, Egino, Duke of Thuringia and Rudolf I, Bishop of Würzburg, are killed in the battle.
 909
 spring – Hungarian troops are raiding in Bavaria and Swabia.
 August 4 – They burn the two churches of Freising in Bavaria.
 August 11 – The returning Hungarians are defeated at Pocking by the Bavarians led by Arnulf, Duke of Bavaria.

 910
 June 12 – The Hungarians crush the army of the German king Louis the Child in the first Battle of Augsburg, led by Count Gozbert of Alemannia. The commander and Managolt, count of Alemannia are killed in the battle.
 June 22 – The same Hungarian army enters Franconia, and defeats a united army of the duchies of Franconia, Lotharingia and Bavaria in the Battle of Rednitz. The German commander Gebhard, Duke of Lorraine and Liudger, Count of Ladengau are killed in the battle.
 King Louis the Child asks for peace and starts to pay a tribute.
 The returning Hungarians plunder the outskirts of Regensburg, sack Altaich and Osterhofen, but one of their minor riding units is defeated by Arnulf, Duke of Bavaria at Neuching.
 911 – Hungarian troops cross Bavaria and attack Swabia and Franconia. They plunder the territories from Meinfeld to Aargau. After that, they cross the Rhine, and attack Burgundy for the first time.
 912 – Hungarians attack Franconia and Thuringia, in order to force the new East Francian king, Conrad I of Germany to pay them tribute.

 913 – Hungarian raid to Bavaria, Swabia and Northern Burgundy. At their return they face the combined army of Arnulf, Duke of Bavaria, Erchanger, Duke of Swabia, dukes Udalrich and Berchtold, who defeat them at Aschbach by Inn.
 914 – Duke Arnulf, Duke of Bavaria and his family is forced to flee to Hungary by king Conrad I of Germany. The Hungarians promise him help to regain his throne.
 915 – A Hungarian army devastates Swabia then Franconia. One of their plundering units attack the Fulda monastery, but they are repelled, they burn the Abbey of Corvey, plunder the monastery St. Ida in Herzfeld. In Saxony the Hungarians plunder Valun, then they burn Bremen, and after defeating a Saxon army at Eresburg, they arrive to the Danish border.
 916 – A Hungarian army helps Arnulf, Duke of Bavaria, in his first, unsuccessful attack to regain his duchy.

 917
 Attack to West
 January 21 – The Hungarians sack and burn Basel, then invade the Duchy of Alsace.
 February – They enter Lotharingia, destroying Verdun, burning Moyenmoutier and the monasteries of Saint-Dié-des-Vosges and Remiremont.
 With Hungarian help, Arnulf, Duke of Bavaria reoccupies his realm from the forces of Conrad I of Germany. After this he becomes a faithful ally of the Hungarians, paying them tribute, as well as his neighbour, Burchard II, Duke of Swabia.
 Hungarian troops are helping Simeon I of Bulgaria to defeat the Byzantines in the great Battle of Acheloos.

 919–920
 After the election of Henry the Fowler as the new king of East Francia, a Hungarian army enters in Germany, and defeats Henry's forces in the Battle of Püchen, then heads towards West.
 The Hungarian army enters Lotharingia and France. King Charles the Simple cannot gather enough forces to face them in a battle, retreats, and lets them to plunder his realm.
 Early 920, the same Hungarian army enter from West in Burgundy, then in Lombardy, and defeats the forces of Rudolf II of Burgundy, who attacked Berengar I of Italy, the ally of the Principality of Hungary. After that, the Magyars plunder the surrounding of those Italian cities, which they think that supported Rudolf: Bergamo, Piacenza and Nogara.Bóna István (2000). p. 44
 921–922
 In 921 a Hungarian army led by Dursac and Bogát, enters Northern Italy, then annihilates, between Brescia and Verona ,the forces of the Italian supporters of Rudolf II of Burgundy, killing the palatine Odelrik, and taking as captive Gislebert, the count of Bergamo.
 This army goes towards southern Italy, where it winters, and in January 922 plunders the regions between Rome and Naples.
 February 4 – The Magyar army attacks Apulia in Southern Italy, ruled by the Byzantines.

 924
 Campaign in Italy and Southern France
 Spring – Rudolf II of Burgundy is elected by the Italian insurgents as king of Italy in Pavia. Emperor Berengar I of Italy asks the Hungarians for help, whom then send an army led by Szalárd, who burns Pavia and the war galleys on the shores of the Ticino river.
 April 7 – When emperor Berengar is assassinated in Verona, the Hungarians go towards Burgundy. Rudolf II of Burgundy and Hugh of Arles try to encircle them in the passes of the Alps, but the Hungarians escape from the ambush, and attack Gothia and the outskirts of Nîmes. They return home because a plague breaks out among them.
 Campaign in Saxony
 Another Hungarian army plunders Saxony. The German king Henry the Fowler retreats to the castle of Werla. A Hungarian noble falls by accident in the hands of the Germans. King Henry uses this opportunity to negotiate with the Hungarians, asking for peace, and accepting to pay a tribute to the Principality of Hungary.

 926
 May 1–8 – Hungarian troops enter Swabia, as allies of the new Italian king, Hugh of Italy, besiege Augsburg, and then occupy the Abbey of Sankt Gallen, where they spare the life of the monk Heribald, whose accounts give a detailed description about their traditions and way of life. From the abbey they send minor units to reconnoitre and plunder the surroundings. One of their units kills Saint Wiborada who lived as anchoress in a wood nearby.
 After May 8 – The Magyars besiege Konstanz, burning its suburbs, then head towards West in the direction of Schaffhausen and Basel. One of their units is defeated by the locals at Säckingen on the shores of the Rhine. The Hungarian army cross the Rhine with some captured ships into Alsace, and defeat the troops of count Liutfred. Then, following the Rhine they went towards North, sack the surroundings of Voncq, arrive to the Atlantic Ocean's shores, then head towards home via Reims. On their way home, they renew the alliance with Arnulf, Duke of Bavaria.
 July 29 – The Hungarians destroy Oberkirchen.

 927 – Hungarian troops are called by King Hugh of Italy to help margrave Peter regain his power in Rome, against Pope John X, which they succeed. During and after these events, they plunder Tuscany and Apulia, taking many prisoners, and occupying the cities of Oria and Taranto.
 931 – A Hungarian army burns the Italian city of Piacenza.
 933
 Beginning of March – Because the German king Henry the Fowler refused to continue to pay tribute to the Principality of Hungary, a Magyar army enters Saxony. They enter from the lands of the Slavic tribe of Dalamancians, who refuse their alliance proposal, then the Hungarians split in two, but soon the army which tries to outflank Saxony from west, is defeated by the combined forces of Saxony and Thuringia near Gotha.
 March 15 – The other army besieges Merseburg, but after that, is defeated in the Battle of Riade by the kings army.

 934
 West
 A Hungarian army raids in the environs of Metz in Lotharingia.
 Balkans
 War breaks out between the Hungarians and the Pechenegs, but a peace is concluded after the news of a Bulgarian attack against their territories, coming from the town of W.l.n.d.r (probably Belgrade). The Hungarians and the Pechenegs decide to attack this town.
 April – The Hungarian-Pecheneg army defeats, in the Battle of W.l.n.d.r, the relieving Byzantine-Bulgarian forces then conquer the city, and plunder it for three days.
 May–June – The allies plunder Bulgaria, then head towards Constantinople, where they camp for 40 days, and sack Thrace, taking many captives. The Byzantine Empire concludes a peace treaty with the Hungarians, ransom captives, and accepts to pay tribute to the Principality of Hungary.
 935 – Hungarian raid to Aquitaine and Bourges. They return towards home in Burgundy and Northern Italy, where they plunder the environs of Brescia.

 936–937
 End of 936 – The Hungarians, with the aim to force the new German king, Otto I, to pay them tribute, attack Swabia and Franconia, and burn the Fulda monastery. They then enter Saxony, but the new king's forces repel them towards Lotharingia and West Francia.
 February 21, 937 – They enter Lotharingia, crossing the Rhine at Worms, and advance towards Namur.
 The Hungarians occupy the Abbey of Saint Basolus from Verzy, which they use as headquarters. They then send plundering units to attack the abbeys from Orbay, Saint Macra from Fîmes, the city of Bouvancourt.
 March 24 – They reach the city of Sens, where they burn the Abbey of Saint Peter.
 At Orléans they fight a French army led by count Ebbes de Déols, who is wounded in the battle and dies afterwards. After this, the Hungarians, following the course of the Loire, cross the whole of France until the Atlantic Ocean, then return through the South-East, and on their way to Burgundy, they plunder the surroundings of Bourges.
 After July 11 – The Hungarians enter Burgundy near Dijon, harrying the Monastery of Luxeuil, then they plunder the valley of the Rhône, burn the city of Tournus, occupy the monasteries of Saint Deicolus and Saint Marcell, but fail at the Monastery of Saint Appollinaris.
 August – Continuing their campaign, the Hungarians enter Lombardy from the West, where Hugh of Italy asks them to go to Southern Italy to help the Byzantines. The Hungarians plunder the surroundings of Capua, and install their camp in Campania. They send small units to plunder the regions of Naples, Benevento, Sarno, Nola and Montecassino. The Abbey of Montecassino gives them valuable objects valuing 200 Byzantine hyperpyrons in order to ransom the captives.
 Autumn – One Hungarian unit returning home is ambushed in the Abruzzo Mountains by local forces, and loses its plunder.
 938
 End of July – The Hungarians attack Thuringia and Saxony, and set camp at the Bode, north to the Harz mountains, and send its raiding units in every direction. One of these units is defeated at Wolfenbüttel, and its leader killed. Another unit is misled by its Slavic guides on the marshes of Drömling, ambushed, and massacred by the Germans at Belxa. The Hungarians ransom the captured leader of this unit.
 After 31 August – Hearing about these defeats, the main Hungarian army, camped at the Bode river, withdraws to Hungary.
 940 April – The Hungarian auxiliary troops helping Hugh of Italy in his campaign against Rome are victorious at Lateran against the Roman nobles, but are then defeated by the Longobards.

 942
 Spring – A Hungarian army enters Italy, where king Hugh, giving them 10 bushels of gold, persuades them to attack the Caliphate of Córdoba.
 Middle of June – They arrive in Catalonia, plunder the region, then enter the northern territories of the Caliphate of Córdoba.
 June 23 – The Hungarians besiege Lérida for 8 days, then attack Cerdaña and Huesca.
 June 26 – The Hungarians capture Yahya ibn Muhammad ibn al Tawil, the ruler of Barbastro, and hold him captive 33 days, until he is ransomed.
 July – The Hungarians find themselves on desert territory and run out of food and water. They kill their Italian guide and return towards Italy. Five Hungarian soldiers are taken prisoner by the Cordobans and become bodyguards of the caliph.
 The Hungarians plunder the region of Latium and defeat the sortieing Romans who attacked them.
 943
 Balkans
 Allied with the Kievan Rus, a Hungarian army attacks the Byzantine Empire. Emperor Romanos I Lekapenos buys peace, and accepts to pay a yearly tribute to the Hungarians.
 Bavaria
 The Hungarians who attacked Bavaria, are defeated in the Battle of Wels by Berthold, Duke of Bavaria and the Carantanians.
 947 – A Hungarian army, led by prince Taksony, campaigns in Italy, heading southwards on the Eastern shore of the peninsula. It besieges Larino, and reaches Otranto, plundering Apulia for 3 months.
 948 – Two Hungarian armies attack Bavaria and Karintia. One of them is defeated at Flozzun in Nordgau by Henry I, Duke of Bavaria.
 949 August 9 – The Hungarians defeat the Bavarians at Laa.Kristó Gyula: Levedi törzsszövetségétől Szent István Államáig; Magvető Könyvkiadó, Budapest, 1980, p. 282
 950 – Henry I, Duke of Bavaria attacks Western Hungary, taking captives and plunder.
 951
 Spring – Hungarians, crossing through Lombardia, attack Aquitania.
 November 20 – The returning Hungarians are defeated by the Germans, who in the meanwhile had conquered the Kingdom of Italy.

 954
 The German princes rebel against Otto I, and ally with the Hungarians, who in February sends an army led by Bulcsú to help them. The Magyar army plunders the domains of Otto's allies in Bavaria, Swabia and Frankonia.
 March 1 – The Hungarians cross the Rhine, camp at Worms in the capital of their ally, Conrad, Duke of Lorraine, then on March 19, they head towards West, attacking the domains of the dukes enemies, Bruno the Great, archbishop of Cologne, then count Ragenarius, crossing the rivers Moselle and Maas.Baják László (2000). p. 28
 The Hungarians plunder the regions of Hesbaye and Carbonaria in today's Belgium, plunder and burn the Monastery of Saint Lambert from Hainaut, plunder the monastery of Moorsel, and sack the cities of Gembloux and Tournai.
 April 2 – They besiege the Lobbes Abbey, but the monks defend the monastery. However, the Hungarians burn the church of Saint Paul, and take with them the treasures of the abbey.
 April 6–10 – The Hungarians besiege the city of Cambrai, burn its suburbs, but are unable to conquer the city. One of Bulcsú's relatives is killed by the defenders. They refuse to return his body to the Hungarians, who in return kill all their captives and burn the monastery of Saint Géry near Cambrai.
 After April 6 – the Hungarians cross the French border, plundering the surroundings of Laon, Reims, Chalon, Metz, Gorze. After that, they return home via Burgundy and Northern Italy.
 In Provence, the Hungarian army battled with the Arabs from the Muslim enclave of Fraxinet, when Conrad I of Burgundy fell on them by surprise and defeated the two combatant armies.

 955
 Middle of July – Called by the Bavarian and Saxonian insurgents, a Hungarian army led by Bulcsú, Lehel, Sur, and Taksony breaks into Germany, plundering Bavaria, then enters Swabia and burns many monasteries.
 Beginning of August – The Hungarians start besieging Augsburg.
 August 10 – The German army of Otto I defeats the Hungarian army and puts it to flight, in the Battle of Lechfeld. Despite the victory, the German losses were heavy, among them many nobles: Conrad, Duke of Lorraine, Count Dietpald, Ulrich count of Aargau, the Bavarian count Berthold, etc.
 August 10–11 – The Germans capture Bulcsú, Lehel, and Sur. Many Hungarians die during the flight, killed by the Germans.
 August 15 – Bulcsú, Lehel, and Sur are hanged in Regensburg. End of the Hungarian invasions towards the West.

 959 April–May – Because in 957 the Byzantines ceased the payment of tribute, a Hungarian army, led by Apor, attacks the empire, plunders its territories up to Constantinople, but on its way back, it is defeated by the Byzantines in a night attack.
 961 – A Hungarian army attacks Thrace and Macedonia, but it is defeated, in a night attack, by the Byzantine army.
 966 – The Hungarians attack the First Bulgarian Empire, and force tsar Peter I of Bulgaria to conclude peace with them, and to let them cross to Byzance.
 968 – A Hungarian army attacks the Byzantine Empire, and splits into two groups. Near Thessaloniki, one army group of 300 men takes 500 Greek captives, and takes them to Hungary. The other army group of 200 men is ambushed by the Byzantines who take 40 of them as captives. They become bodyguards of emperor Nikephoros II Phokas.
 970 – Sviatoslav I of Kiev attacks the Byzantine empire with Hungarian auxiliary troops. The Byzantines defeat Sviatoslav's army in the Battle of Arcadiopolis. End of the Hungarian invasions of Europe.

Tactics

Their army had mostly light cavalry and were highly mobile. Attacking without warning, they quickly plundered the countryside and departed before any defensive force could be organized. If forced to fight, they would harass their enemies with arrows, then suddenly retreat, tempting their opponents to break ranks and pursue, after which the Hungarians would turn to fight them singly. This tactic is formally known as a feigned retreat.„ab Ungerorum nos defendas iaculis” = „protect us from the arrows of the Hungarians”'' - Hymn from Modena, around 900

Aftermath
The Hungarians were the last invading people to establish a permanent presence in Central Europe. Paul K. Davis writes, the "Magyar defeat (at the Battle of Lechfeld) ended more than 90 years of their pillaging western Europe and convinced survivors to settle down, creating the basis for the state of Hungary." In the following centuries, the Hungarians adopted western European forms of feudal military organization, including the predominant use of heavily armored cavalry.

Notes

External links
Hungary in the Carpathian Basin

 
Wars involving Hungary
Wars involving the Holy Roman Empire
Wars involving the Byzantine Empire
Invasions of Europe